Malena Cavo (born 2 April 1999) is an Argentine handball player for Dorrego Handball and the Argentine national team.

Achievements
2021 South and Central American Women's Handball Championship: All star team right back

References

Argentine female handball players
1999 births
Living people
Handball players at the 2019 Pan American Games
Pan American Games medalists in handball
Pan American Games silver medalists for Argentina
Medalists at the 2019 Pan American Games
21st-century Argentine women